Fanta is an American-owned German brand of fruit-flavored carbonated soft drinks created by Coca-Cola Deutschland under the leadership of German businessman Max Keith. There are more than 200 flavors worldwide. Fanta originated in Germany as a Coca-Cola alternative in 1940 due to the American trade embargo of Nazi Germany, which affected the availability of Coca-Cola ingredients. Fanta soon dominated the German market with three million cases sold in 1943. The current formulation of Fanta was developed in Italy in 1955.

History

Origins

During the Second World War, the US established a trade embargo against Nazi Germany, making the export of Coca-Cola syrup difficult. To circumvent this, Max Keith, the head of Coca-Cola Deutschland (Coca-Cola GmbH), decided to create a new product for the German market, using only ingredients available in Germany at the time, including sugar beet, whey (a cheese byproduct), and apple pomace—the "leftovers of leftovers", as Keith later recalled. The name was the result of a brainstorming session, which started with Keith's exhorting his team to "use their imagination" (Fantasie in German), to which one of his salesmen, Joe Knipp, retorted "Fanta!".

The German plant was cut off from Coca-Cola headquarters following America's entry into the war following the Japanese attack on Pearl Harbor in 1941. After the war, the Coca-Cola Company regained control of the plant, formula, and the trademarks to the new Fanta product—as well as the plant profits made during the war.

In 1943 alone, 3 million cases of Fanta were sold in Germany. Many bottles were not consumed as a beverage but used as a cooking ingredient to add sweetness and flavor to soups and stews, as sugar was severely rationed.

During the war, the Dutch Coca-Cola plant in Amsterdam (N.V. Nederlandse Coca-Cola Maatschappij) suffered the same difficulties as the German Coca-Cola plant. Keith put the Fanta brand at the disposal of the Dutch Coca-Cola plant, of which he had been appointed the official caretaker. Dutch Fanta had a different recipe from German Fanta, elderberries being one of the main ingredients.

Fanta production was discontinued when the German and Dutch Coca-Cola branches were reunited with their parent company after 1945. Following the launch of several drinks by Pepsi-Cola in the 1950s, Coca-Cola relaunched Fanta in 1955. The drink was heavily marketed in Europe, Asia, Africa, and South America, although it did not become widely available in the United States until the 1960s because the company feared it would undermine the strong market position of their flagship cola.

The modern-day orange Fanta was first produced in Naples, Italy in 1955 by a local bottling plant using locally sourced oranges.

Marketing

75th anniversary version
In February 2015, a 75th-anniversary version of Fanta was released in Germany. Packaged in glass bottles evoking the original design and with an authentic original wartime flavor including 30% whey and pomace, it is described on the packaging as "less sweet" and a German original. An associated television ad referenced the history of the drink and said the Coca-Cola company wanted to bring back "the feeling of the Good Old Times" which was interpreted by many to mean Nazi rule. The ad was subsequently replaced.

International availability 
There are more than 200 flavors worldwide; the recipes can differ per country.  The Orange flavor recipe outside the US contains orange juice and the American version has none.  

In Mexico, Fanta is made with sugar whereas the US version uses high fructose corn syrup.  In the UK, the sugar content was reduced in 2017 to 4.6% per 100ml in the standard version (non-sugar free) to ensure that the product was below the 5g that will incur the soft drinks levy (sugary drink tax). This was a third lower than the recipe used before 2016, as some of the sugar was replaced by sweeteners.

In Albania, Bosnia and Herzegovina, Croatia, Poland, Serbia, Romania, Sweden, and some other European countries, there is Fanta Shokata (a wordplay on "soc" which means both "elderberry" and "shock" in Romanian) based on an elderflower blossom extract drink. In Russia, however, "Shokata" is the rebranding of Fanta Citrus, which is more like a common lemonade. This version of the drink is actually clear, like ordinary lemonade, while the bottle is blue-colored.

See also 
 Minute Maid
 Hi-C
 Coca-Cola
 Lilt

References

External links 

 
 
 

Products introduced in 1940
Coca-Cola brands
Fruit sodas
German inventions of the Nazi period
Orange sodas
German drinks
1940 in Germany